The 1974 NCAA Division II baseball tournament decided the champion of baseball at the NCAA Division II level for the 1974 season. This was the seventh such tournament for the Division, having separated from the University Division in 1957, and further dividing into Division II and Division III for the 1974 season.

Regionals

Northeast Region

South Atlantic Region

Mideast Region

South Region

Midwest Region

West Region

Finals

Participants

Results

Bracket

Game results

See also
 1974 NCAA Division I baseball tournament
 1974 NAIA World Series

References

 
NCAA Division II Baseball Tournament
NCAA Division II baseball tournament